Justin Tafa (born December 13, 1993) is a New Zealand-born Australian mixed martial arts fighter of Samoan heritage, currently competing in the Heavyweight division of the Ultimate Fighting Championship.

Early life
Tafa was born in Auckland, New Zealand, to a family of Samoan descent, and grew up in the West Auckland suburb of Avondale. Tafa's grandfather was a national boxing champion while his three brothers have also fought professionally. One of his brothers, Junior Tafa, is a former Glory heavyweight kickboxer and now a MMA fighter in the Heavyweight division of the UFC as well.

Rugby league career
He played for the Marist Saints in the junior Auckland Rugby League and was signed to the Melbourne Storm. Tafa's athletic career began in rugby league, and he was signed to the Melbourne Storm and played in the under-20s competition but a run of injuries left him disillusioned with the sport.

Mixed martial arts career

Early career
Tafa made his professional debut at XFC 30, with a second-round stoppage of Dylan Tiaaleaiga. Tafa was then scheduled to fight Jeremy Joiner for the XFC Heavyweight title, at XFC 36. He won the fight by TKO, after just 28 seconds.

Tafa was scheduled to make his first title defense against David Taumoepeau on May 24, 2019, at XFC 41. He won the fight by a second-round TKO, stopping his opponent 30 seconds into the second round.

Ultimate Fighting Championship 
Tafa made his promotional debut on October 6, 2019 at UFC 243 against Yorgan De Castro. He lost the fight via knockout in the first round.

For his second fight with the promotion, Tafa faced Juan Adams on February 8, 2020 at UFC 247. He won the fight via TKO in the first round.

Tafa was scheduled to face Raphael Pessoa on July 25, 2020 at UFC on ESPN 14. However, he pulled out on July 15 due to unknown reasons and was replaced by Tanner Boser.

Tafa faced Carlos Felipe on January 16, 2021 at UFC on ABC: Holloway vs. Kattar. He lost the bout via split decision. 16 out of 20 media scores gave it to Tafa.

Tafa faced Jared Vanderaa on May 22, 2021 at UFC Fight Night: Font vs. Garbrandt. He lost the bout via unanimous decision. This bout earned him the Fight of the Night award.

Tafa faced Harry Hunsucker on December 18, 2021 at UFC Fight Night 199. At the weigh-ins, Tafa weighed in at 267 pounds, 1 pound over the heavyweight non-title fight limit, marking the first time in UFC history that a fighter missed weight in that division. The bout proceeded at catchweight and Tafa was fined a percentage of his purse, which went to Hunsucker. He won the fight via knockout in the first round.

Tafa was scheduled to face Jake Collier on April 30, 2022 at UFC on ESPN 35. However, Tafa withdrew from event for undisclosed reasons, and was replaced by Andrei Arlovski.

Tafa was scheduled to face Don'Tale Mayes on July 30, 2022, at UFC 277. Tafa pulled out due to undisclosed reasons and was replaced by promotional newcomer Hamdy Abdelwahab.

Tafa faced Parker Porter on February 12, 2023, at UFC 284. He won the fight via knockout in the first round.

Championships and achievements

Mixed martial arts
Ultimate Fighting Championship
Fight of the Night (One time) 
Australian Xtreme Fighting Championship 
 XFC Heavyweight Championship. (One Time)
One successful defense

Mixed martial arts record

|-
|Win
|align=center|6–3
|Parker Porter
|KO (punches)
|UFC 284
|
|align=center|1
|align=center|1:06
|Perth, Australia 
|
|-
|Win
|align=center|5–3
|Harry Hunsucker
|KO (head kick)
|UFC Fight Night: Lewis vs. Daukaus
|
|align=center|1
|align=center|1:53
|Las Vegas, Nevada, United States
|
|-
|Loss
|align=center|4–3
|Jared Vanderaa
|Decision (unanimous)
|UFC Fight Night: Font vs. Garbrandt
|
|align=center|3
|align=center|5:00
|Las Vegas, Nevada, United States
|
|-
|Loss
|align=center|4–2
|Carlos Felipe
|Decision (split)
|UFC on ABC: Holloway vs. Kattar
|
|align=center|3
|align=center| 5:00
|Abu Dhabi, United Arab Emirates
|
|-
|Win
|align=center|4–1
|Juan Adams
|TKO (punches)
|UFC 247
|
|align=center|1
|align=center|1:59
|Houston, Texas, United States
|
|-
|Loss
|align=center|3–1
|Yorgan De Castro
|KO (punch)
|UFC 243
|
|align=center|1
|align=center|2:10
|Melbourne, Australia
|
|-
|Win
|align=center| 3–0
|David Taumoepeau
|TKO (punches)
|XFC 41
|
|align="center" | 2
|align="center" | 0:30
|Brisbane, Australia
|
|-
|Win
|align=center|2–0
|Jeremy Joiner
|TKO (punches)
|XFC 36
|
|align=center|1
|align=center|0:28
|Brisbane, Australia
|
|-
|Win
|align=center|1–0
|Dylan Tiaaleaiga
|TKO (punches)
|XFC 30
|
|align=center|2
|align=center|3:35
|Brisbane, Australia
|

See also 
 List of current UFC fighters
 List of male mixed martial artists

References

External links
 
 

1993 births
Living people
Heavyweight mixed martial artists
Mixed martial artists utilizing Brazilian jiu-jitsu
New Zealand male mixed martial artists
New Zealand practitioners of Brazilian jiu-jitsu
New Zealand sportspeople of Samoan descent
Ultimate Fighting Championship male fighters
Sportspeople from Auckland
New Zealand rugby league players
New Zealand expatriate sportspeople in Australia